DAC, an initialism for Diesel Auto Camion, is a Romanian truck brand produced since the 1970s in the Brașov area. Since 1990, DAC has been the special truck division of ROMAN trucks manufacturer.

History
ROMAN was established after World War II on the foundation of the old ROMLOC automotive factory built in 1921. In the spirit of the communist days, the industrial plant was named Steagul Rosu (The Red Flag). As of 2000, 750,000 trucks had been produced.

DAC trucks share the same construction platforms with the Roman trucks but it was not part of the 1971 venture between the then-West German company MAN and the Romanian government.

CN Series
The CN series was an in house development of AD Basov available since 1977. The CN is available with 4x4, 6x6 and 8x8 wheel configurations and 3 to 10 ton cargo capacity. The CN Series feature a rectangular shaped all-metal cab with horizontally grooved doors and side panels, flat front end and a sloping hinged windshield. Vehicles are equipped with license built MAN D2156 6-cylinder diesel engines and a 5- or 6 -speed transmission, 2-speed transfercase, wheel planetary gear drives, wheels with lockable differentials, dual airbrakes, power steering and a 24-volt electrical devices.

Models
 DAC 120 DE
 DAC 6135

Gallery

See also
 Roman (vehicle manufacturer)
 Rocar DAC

References

External links
 DAC information at Truck Planet
 Scroll thru pages for DAC info (Romanian)
 Roman-DAC Internet Site Truck 

Truck manufacturers of Romania
Companies based in Braşov
Privatized companies in Romania
Romanian brands